Rantso Alfred Mokopane (born 8 August 1994) is a South African runner specialising in the 3000 metres steeplechase. He won silver medals at the 2017 and 2019 Summer Universiade.

International competitions

Personal bests
Outdoor
800 metres – 1:53.41 (Pretoria 2014)
1500 metres – 3:38.83 (Cape Town 2017)
One mile – 3:58.92 (Paarl 2018)
3000 metres – 7:57.40 (Nembro 2019)
5000 metres – 14:05.04 (Cape Town 2017)
3000 metres steeplechase – 8:30.37 (Naples 2019)
10 kilometres – 30:03 (Durban 2017)

References

1994 births
Living people
South African male steeplechase runners
Universiade silver medalists for South Africa
Universiade medalists in athletics (track and field)
Medalists at the 2017 Summer Universiade
Medalists at the 2019 Summer Universiade